The Tram Was Going, Number Nine is a Ukrainian animated film about a tram that traces how people discuss their everyday lives. It was created by Ukranimafilm studio in 2002.

Interesting facts 
 The movie production was difficult, due to lack of funds in the state studio. 
 The director initially proposed the use of paper animation, but decided to use Plasticine due to the lack of availability of paper.
 The working title of the film, "Bus Number 8," was recorded at the Ministry of Culture of Ukraine. In the late stages of development, the director decided to rename it to "Tram Number 8."
 Filming started in 1999 but was suspended until November 2001.
 Due to these changes in timing, the director had to condense the filming from the original 8–9 months to 5 months.
 Recording costed about 80,000 UAH (US$15,000), funded largely from a presidential grant issued to Stepan Koval in 1998.
 The authors did not have time to create subtitles, so the tape was provided without them at the Berlin Film Festival. However, it was very well received by the public.
 The film won a 'Special Mention' award from the 2003 FANTOCHE awards.

Plot 
The film tells about a familiar situation: a morning tram filled with passengers, which people are trying to catch to get to work. Children, seniors, a young family and neighbours are discussing the show. This is what the average Ukrainian experiences on his way to work, as the transport situation shows. The situation is shown in an interesting, bright and witty way.

The film uses a Plasticine animation technique to  portray these events intelligently.

Cast 
 Stepan Koval — writer, director, art director
 Eugene Syvokin — artistic director
 Igor Zhuk — composer
 R. Boyko — arrangements
 Olexander Nikolaenko — cameraman
 Vyacheslav Yaschenko — sound engineer
 L. Mishchenko — artist-animator
 A. Tsurikov — artist-animator
 A. Pedan — artist-animator
 S. Koval — artist-animator
 Alexander Fomenko — decorator
 B. Hahun — decorator
 A. Radchenko — decorator
 Svitlana Kutsenko — editor
 Lydia Mokrousov — installation
 B. Kilinski — Director

Sound 
 E. Shah
 Ruslana Pysanka
 I. Kapinos-Pavlyshyno
 Yuri Kovalenko

References

External links
 

2002 films
Ukrainian-language films
Ukrainian animated films